Md. Abdul Maleque (born 15 January 1947) is a Bangladeshi politician. He is the chairman of the Naogaon District branch of Bangladesh Awami League. He was a Member of Parliament from Naogaon-5.

Early life
Maleque was born on 15 January 1947. He has an M.A. degree.

Political career
Abdul Maleque's political career started before the independence of Bangladesh from Pakistan. He was a member of Bangladesh Chhatra League. He participated in the Liberation War of Bangladesh. In 2009, Maleque was elected as the chairman of the upazila parishad of Naogaon Sadar Upazila. In 2013, the constituency of Naogaon-5 fell vacant upon the death of Abdul Jalil. The Awami League nominated Maleque as their candidate for the by-election. As there was no other candidate he was declared MP. In 2014 general election, he was again nominated by Awami League and won.

References

1947 births
Living people
Awami League politicians
10th Jatiya Sangsad members
People from Naogaon District